In Greek mythology, Acaste (or Akaste; ; Ancient Greek: Ακαστη) was one of the 3,000 Oceanids, the daughters of the Titans Oceanus and his sister-spouse Tethys. According to the Homeric Hymn 2 to Demeter, Acaste was, along with several of her Oceanid sisters, one of the companions of Persephone who were picking flowers with her when she was abducted by Hades.

Notes

References 
 Bell, Robert E., Women of Classical Mythology: A Biographical Dictionary. ABC-Clio. 1991. .
 Hesiod, Theogony, in The Homeric Hymns and Homerica with an English Translation by Hugh G. Evelyn-White, Cambridge, Massachusetts, Harvard University Press; London, William Heinemann Ltd. 1914. Online version at the Perseus Digital Library.
 Homeric Hymn 2 to Demeter, in The Homeric Hymns and Homerica with an English Translation by Hugh G. Evelyn-White, Cambridge, Massachusetts, Harvard University Press; London, William Heinemann Ltd. 1914. Online version at the Perseus Digital Library.
 Parada, Carlos, Genealogical Guide to Greek Mythology, Jonsered, Paul Åströms Förlag, 1993. .

Oceanids
Rape of Persephone